Betsiamites may refer to:

 the Betsiamites River in Quebec,
 the Innu community of Betsiamites (also known as Pessamit) on the river.